Săcele is a commune in Constanța County, Northern Dobruja, Romania.

Villages in the Săcele commune:
 Săcele (historical names: Peletlia), named after Săcele
 Traian - named after the Roman emperor Trajan

Demographics
At the 2011 census, Săcele had 2,027 Romanians (99.51%), 4 Tatars (0.20%), 6 others (0.29%).

Famous natives
 Gheorghe Hagi, footballer (1965-)

References

Communes in Constanța County
Localities in Northern Dobruja